Coleophora cirsiella is a moth of the family Coleophoridae that is endemic to Turkey.

References

External links

cirsiella
Endemic fauna of Turkey
Moths described in 2002
Moths of Asia